Warren Anthony Rayner (born 24 April 1957) is an English former professional footballer who played as a right winger. He later became a coach.

Playing career
Born in Bradford, Rayner joined Bradford City from local amateur football in May 1972, joining the first team in April 1975. He made 17 league appearances for the club, before moving to Guiseley in 1977. He later played for Gainsborough Trinity.

Coaching career
In July 2016 he was working as Head of Development Phase at the Bradford City Academy. In November 2017 he was manager of non-league Eccleshill United.

Sources

References

1957 births
Living people
Footballers from Bradford
English footballers
Association football wingers
Bradford City A.F.C. players
Guiseley A.F.C. players
Gainsborough Trinity F.C. players
English Football League players
English football managers
Eccleshill United F.C. managers
Bradford City A.F.C. non-playing staff
Association football coaches